Chikkodi-Sadalga Assembly constituency is one of the 224 constituencies in the Karnataka Legislative Assembly of Karnataka a south state of India. Chikkodi-Sadalga seat is a segment of Chikkodi Lok Sabha constituency. Two Assembly seats, Chikkodi and Sadalga, were merged to form Chikkodi-Sadalga Assembly constituency.

2018 assembly elections

Members of Legislative Assembly
 1952-2007 : Seat did not exist
 2008: Prakash Babanna Hukkeri, Indian National Congress
 2013: Prakash Babanna Hukkeri, Indian National Congress
 2014 (By-poll): Ganesh Prakash Hukkeri, Indian National Congress

See also
 Belagavi district
 Chikkodi Lok Sabha constituency
 List of constituencies of Karnataka Legislative Assembly

References

Assembly constituencies of Karnataka
Belagavi district